The Oregon Historic District is a neighborhood in Dayton, Ohio. The Oregon District includes one of the earliest surviving combinations of commercial and residential architecture in Dayton. Examples of Dayton's architectural history from 1820 to 1915 line the brick streets and lanes in this 12 square block area. Styles range from Federal to Queen Anne. Excellent examples of late Victorian commercial and residential architecture illustrate both the entrepreneurial success and the increasing affluence of many Oregon merchants and residents. The district is populated with art galleries, specialty shops, pubs, nightclubs, and coffee houses.

Historic district

The origin of the name "Oregon" for the area is uncertain but is known to have been in use at least as early as 1845. In 1974, Oregon was registered on the National Register of Historic Places, between Patterson Blvd. and Wayne Ave., north to Gates St. and south to U.S. Route 35, and Downtown Dayton (No. 75001506). City of Dayton Ordinance #24358-9.

Architecture 
The architecture of the Oregon Historic District includes examples of Federal, Italianate, Greek Revival and Queen Anne.

People 
 Daniel C. Cooper
 John H. Balsley

See also
National Register of Historic Places listings in Dayton, Ohio

References

External links
 Oregon Historic District
 Oregon Historic District on Dayton MostMetro
 Preservation Dayton
 City of Dayton's Official Website

National Register of Historic Places in Montgomery County, Ohio
Historic districts on the National Register of Historic Places in Ohio
Oregon
Arts districts